The Dragor is a small river situated in the south of North Macedonia. It flows mainly through the city of Bitola. Its spring is located near Sapunčica, on the Baba Mountain. The Dragor is a right tributary of the Crna river.

References

Rivers of North Macedonia
Bitola